The 1991 season of the Tongatapu Inter Club Championship was the 18th season of top flight association football competition in Tonga. The champion of this season is unknown.

Teams 
 Halapili
 Popua
 Houmakelikao
 Muniao
 Navutoka
 Veitongo FC
 'Atenisi United
 Ngeleʻia FC

References 

Tonga Major League seasons
1991 in Tongan sport